Effective range is a term with several definitions depending upon context.

Distance
Effective range may describe a distance between two points where one point is subject to an energy release at the other point. The source, receiver, and conditions between the two points must be specified to define an effective range. Effective range may represent the maximum distance at which a measuring device or receiver will predictably respond to an energy release of specified magnitude. Alternatively, effective range may be the maximum distance at which the energy released from a specified device will cause the desired effect on a target receiver. Angular dispersion may be significant to effectiveness for asymmetrical energy propagation toward small targets.

Weapons
The following definition has been attributed to the United States Department of Defense: The maximum distance at which a weapon may be expected to be accurate and achieve the desired effect. Accuracy is ambiguous in the absence of a specified hit probability per unit of ammunition; and for any given weapon, the desired effect could be interpreted differently depending upon the target. Subjective interpretation of these variables has caused endless and heated debate for more than a century.

Vehicles
In a broader context, effective range describes the distance a vehicle (including weapon launch platforms like a ship or aircraft) may be expected to deliver a specified payload from a base or refueling point.

Statistics
In statistics, range refers to the difference between the largest and smallest value of a set of quantified observations. Some observers consider it appropriate to remove unusually high or low outlying values to narrow the observed range to an effective range of the quantity being observed. Inferences based on effective range are of somewhat doubtful value if subjective judgement is used to determine which observations are discarded.

Nuclear physics

In nuclear physics research, effective range is a physical parameter in the dimension of length to characterize an effective scattering square well potential. It is related to the scattering phase shift by,

.

where  is defined by the relation of deuteron binding energy .

References

Scale statistics
Length
Nuclear physics